John Cage (1912–1992) was an American composer.

John Cage may also refer to:

People 
 John Cage (Totteridge)

Fictional characters 
 John Cage (character), a fictional character from the Ally McBeal television series
 Johnny Cage, a fictional character from the Mortal Kombat series of video games

Other 
 John Cage Day, a designation given to a number of events in 2012 commemorating the composer